Santa Maria del Carmine is a Roman Catholic church in Pisa, Italy known for its altarpiece.

History
The church was originally built for the Carmelite order in 1325-1328. By 1425, it was decorated with a famed, now dispersed, polyptych by Masaccio. Only one panel of the altarpiece remains in Pisa in the National Museum of San Matteo.

The altarpiece for the Chapel of St. Julian is by Masaccio, assisted by Andrea di Giusto, who painted the predella and assisted with the central panel, "Madonna and Child with Angels".    

The church underwent many reconstructions across the centuries. Both the church and the adjoining monastery underwent extensive transformations between the second half of the 16th century and 1612, when it was newly consecrated. The present simple façade was designed by Alessandro Gherardesca, in the 1830s. The interior has an organ by Andrea Ravani made in 1613, and altars with painting by Baccio Lomi, Aurelio Lomi, Santi di Tito, Alessandro Allori, Francesco Curradi, and Andrea Boscoli.

Since April 2021 the building is closed for an extensive restoration campaign. It is scheduled to reopen in 2022.

Works of Masaccio formerly at Santa Maria del Carmine
Madonna and Child Enthroned, now   in National Gallery of London.
Crucifixion, now in Museo di Capodimonte in Naples.
St. Paul, now in Museo Nazionale di San Matteo of Pisa.
St. Andrew, now   in Getty Museum of Los Angeles.
St. Augustine, now in the Staatliche Museen of Berlin.
St. Jerome, now in the Staatliche Museen of Berlin.
 Two Carmelite Saints, now in the Staatliche Museen of Berlin
Martyrdom of St. John the Baptist and  Crucifixion of St Peter, now in the Staatliche Museen of Berlin.
Stories of St. Julian and St. Nicholas, now in the Staatliche Museen of Berlin.
Adoration of the Magi, now in the Staatliche Museen of Berlin.

See also
 Pisa Altarpiece

References

Sources

Maria Del Carmine
Roman Catholic churches completed in 1835
Churches completed in 1328
14th-century Roman Catholic church buildings in Italy